Kim Kuk-hyang ( or  ; born 4 April 1999) is a North Korean diver. Her main event is 10m platform. At the 2015 World Aquatics Championships, she became the first world champion in Team North Korea after winning the gold medal of women's 10m platform.

References

People's Athletes
North Korean female divers
1999 births
Living people
World Aquatics Championships medalists in diving
Divers at the 2016 Summer Olympics
Olympic divers of North Korea
Universiade medalists in diving
Asian Games medalists in diving
Divers at the 2018 Asian Games
Asian Games silver medalists for North Korea
Medalists at the 2018 Asian Games
Universiade gold medalists for North Korea
Medalists at the 2017 Summer Universiade
21st-century North Korean women